Tetiana Lebedeva (born 20 May 1973) is a Ukrainian alpine skier. She competed in three events at the 1992 Winter Olympics, representing the Unified Team.

References

1973 births
Living people
Ukrainian female alpine skiers
Olympic alpine skiers of the Unified Team
Alpine skiers at the 1992 Winter Olympics
Sportspeople from Kyiv
20th-century Ukrainian women